Taimak Guarriello (born June 27, 1964), known mononymously as Taimak, is an American martial artist, actor, and stuntman, known for his lead role as Leroy Green ("Bruce Leroy") in the 1985 martial arts film The Last Dragon.

Personal life
Taimak was born on June 27, 1964, in Los Angeles, California, to an Italian father and an African-American mother. He currently lives in New York City.

Career
Taimak's leading role in Berry Gordy's The Last Dragon, in which he played Leroy Green, a Bruce Lee-inspired martial artist in search of "The Glow," was his first major break in acting. The film was a financial success and grossed more than $25 million at the box office.

Since The Last Dragon, Taimak has appeared in a number of TV roles and over a dozen plays.

Taimak later appeared in a number of TV roles and music videos including the lead male in Janet Jackson's "Let's Wait Awhile" music video and Debbie Allen's "Special Look" video. He played a date rapist in an episode of the TV show A Different World. He appeared in 36 Crazyfists' music video "Bloodwork."

Taimak has worked with a number of celebrities, including Madonna, and starred in the play Cheaters, which toured the United States. He starred in a hit Off-Broadway show in 2004 called Roadhouse The Comedy, based on the Patrick Swayze film Road House.

In 2002, Taimak opened a gym called Fitness Concepts on the East Side (Manhattan) of Manhattan. He published a fitness DVD titled Taimak FIT (Find Inner Transformation), intended to be the first of a series.

He is an accomplished martial artist and has received black belts in Goju Ryu Karate, Jeet Kune Do, Wing Chun, Hapkido, Jujutsu, Taekwondo, and Brazilian Jiu-Jitsu. He studied Chinese Goju under "The Black Dragon", Ron Van Clief.

He officiated the preliminary MMA bouts at UFC 6 and UFC 7.

In 2006 he made a few appearances alongside Jimmy Yang in Ring of Honor. Yang's character at the time had adopted some of Leroy Green's traits as his own.

In November 2015, Taimak and Cary-Hiroyuki Tagawa were honorees for the Fists of Legends Legacy Award at the Urban Action Showcase & Expo at HBO.

In March 2016, Incorgnito Publishing Press published Taimak's autobiography, Taimak, The Last Dragon.

In 2018, Taimak starred in Sean Stone's martial arts comedy film Fury of the Fist and the Golden Fleece.

Filmography
Fury of the Fist and the Golden Fleece (2018) as Dragon
They're Just My Friends (2006) as Captain Taimak
The System Within (2006) as Pastor Ricky
Book of Swords (2005) as Lucky
Third Watch as Spider (1 episode, 2004)
"Family Ties: Part 2" (2004) TV episode (as Taimak Guarriello) as Spider
Night Class (2001) as Kick boxing instructor
Masquerade (2000) (TV)
Beverly Hills, 90210
I Will Be Your Father Figure (2000) TV episode (as Taimak Guarriello) as Barback
That's the Guy (1999) TV episode (as Taimak Guari) as The Bartender
Dog's Best Friend (1999) TV episode (as Taimak Guari) as The Bartender
Dreamers (1999) as Sam
Red Shoe Diaries
The Forbidden Zone (1996) TV episode as Zoner
 WMAC Masters
"Battle of the Brothers" (1996) TV episode as Striking Eagle
Kickback with Scott Pastore (1994) TV series as Guest
No More Dirty Deals (1993) as Sean Halloway
The White Girl (1990) as  Bob
A Different World
"No Means No" (1989) TV episode as Garth Parks
The Last Dragon (1985) as Leroy Green

Stunts
Madonna: Drowned World Tour 2001 (2001) (TV) (martial arts coordinator) (as Taimak Guarriello)

Self
Acapulco Black Film Festival (2000) (TV) as Himself
Singled Out
 Episode dated 13 December 1995 (1995) TV episode as Taimuk

References

External links

Official website

1964 births
Living people
American people of Italian descent
American male film actors
Male actors from Los Angeles
Male actors from New York City
African-American male actors
American male television actors
American Wing Chun practitioners
American Jeet Kune Do practitioners
American wushu practitioners
American male karateka
American jujutsuka
American male taekwondo practitioners
American practitioners of Brazilian jiu-jitsu
American stunt performers
Gōjū-ryū practitioners
American hapkido practitioners